Pustynya is a rural locality (a village) in Vozhgorskoye Rural Settlement of Leshukonsky District, Arkhangelsk Oblast, Russia. The population was 28 as of 2010.

Geography 
Pustynya is located 192 km southeast of Leshukonskoye (the district's administrative centre) by road. Zubovo is the nearest rural locality.

References 

Rural localities in Leshukonsky District
Leshukonsky District